The Gurdon Bill Store is located in Ledyard, Connecticut. In 1818, the land for the store was purchased by Gurdon Bill and his partner, Philip Gray. In 1819, Gray sold his interest in the store for $500. Bill operated the store until his death in 1856 and the store is believed to have made its final transaction in 1868. It has not been used since it was sold to the Congregational Society in 1875, retaining its historical integrity. It has some unusual architecture in the form of a pent-roof and three-part window shutters. Clouette describes the store as "the best preserved early 19th-century store known in Connecticut." The Gurdon Bill Store was added to the National Register of Historic Places on April 12, 1982.

Design 
The Gurdon Bill Store is named for Gurdon Bill, who was born in 1784. The land was originally purchased by Bill and his partner, Philip Gray, in 1818. Clouette notes that four years later, Bill was the sole owner of the property; a record from 1819 says Gray sold his interest in the store to Bill for $500. Bill continued to run the store until shortly before his death in 1856. At age 21, Bill went to Plainfield Academy and later went on to work with various merchants before setting up the store in North Groton, later incorporated as Ledyard, Connecticut. Clouette notes a brief passage of the store out of the Bill family, soon reacquired, before it was sold to the Congregational Society in 1875. The Congregational Society has made limited use of the store, preserving its historical integrity. Local historians speculate that the store's final transaction was made in 1868; afterwards the store was boarded up and left essentially unused.

The walls extend higher up than the ceiling to an attic for additional storage space. The wood-shingled gable roof also has a smaller pent roof on the front facade that projects about  beyond the wall, which is unusual in New England architecture. The foundation of the store is built upon fieldstone and has stone blocks above the ground; the store has a full cellar. The main facade has two large twelve-by-twelve light sliding sash windows on the left side that can be covered with three-part batten shutters. The main door is a Dutch door with a plain frame and to its right is a smaller six-by-six sash window without a batten shutter. The rear facade is plain and devoid of any windows. The north end of has four windows, two for the attic, and the south end has only two windows for the attic, all with six-over-six sash.

The interior consists of one large room on the south end, from the main entrance, and two smaller connecting rooms on the north. The walls of the main room have wide-board horizontal panels and a large L-shaped counter running parallel to the south and west walls. Behind the counter are tiers of pine shelving and on the west wall are built-in drawers with simple wooden pulls and open bins on the bottom. The east wall has a plank bench. The two connected rooms  on the north are similar with both having "plastered walls, a narrow beaded board for pegs or hooks, simple sliding shutters on the windows, beaded post casings, and brick diagonal fireplaces."

Importance 
Clouette writes, "The Gurdon Bill Store is the best preserved early 19th-century store known in Connecticut. There are earlier store buildings and more elegant ones, but it would appear that the Bill Store is unique in retaining so many of its original features intact, particularly in the interior." It was submitted to the National Historic Register of Places under criteria A for being a "country store" which supplied items that local farmers needed, but could not produce or manufacture. The building also was submitted for its well-adapted and well-preserved architectural integrity. The store also has an unusual pent-roof and three-part window shutters, the purpose of which is not entirely known.

Locally, the Gurdon Bill Store was rumored to have been a tavern or an inn, although no evidence or record indicates such a use, and it was apparently a waystation for stagecoaches. A historical marker in the immediate vicinity ties the Gurdon Bill store to the birthplace of Samuel Seabury, America's first Episcopal bishop. No conclusive evidence for this claim exists.

See also
National Register of Historic Places listings in New London County, Connecticut

References

Commercial buildings on the National Register of Historic Places in Connecticut
Commercial buildings completed in 1818
Buildings and structures in New London County, Connecticut
Ledyard, Connecticut
National Register of Historic Places in New London County, Connecticut